Eczema vaccinatum is a rare severe adverse reaction to smallpox vaccination.

It is characterized by serious local or disseminated, umbilicated, vesicular, crusting skin rashes in the face, neck, chest, abdomen, upper limbs and hands, caused by widespread infection of the skin in people with previous diagnosed skin conditions such as eczema or atopic dermatitis, even if the conditions are not active at the time. Other signs and symptoms include fever and facial and supraglottic edema. The condition may be fatal if severe and left untreated. Survivors are likely to have some scarring (pockmarks).

Smallpox vaccine should not be given to patients with a history of eczema.  Because of the danger of transmission of vaccinia, it also should not be given to people in close contact with anyone who has active eczema and who has not been vaccinated. People with other skin diseases (such as atopic dermatitis, burns, impetigo, or herpes zoster) also have an increased risk of contracting eczema vaccinatum and should not be vaccinated against smallpox.

Presentation

Associations
Eczema is also associated with increased complications related to other vesiculating viruses such as chickenpox; this is called eczema herpeticum.

Diagnosis
A culture of vesicular fluid will grow vaccinia virus. Skin biopsy shows necrotic epidermal cells with intranuclear inclusions.

Treatment
Eczema vaccinatum is a serious medical condition that requires immediate and intensive medical care. Therapy has been  supportive, such as antibiotics, fluid replacement, antipyretics and analgesics, skin healing, etc.; vaccinia immune globulin (VIG) could be very useful but supplies may be deficient as of 2006.  Antiviral drugs have been examined for activity in pox viruses and cidofovir is believed to display potential in this area.

Recent cases
In March 2007, a two-year-old Indiana boy and his mother contracted the life-threatening vaccinia infection from his father who was vaccinated against smallpox as part of the standard vaccination protocol for individuals serving in the US armed forces beginning in 2002. The child developed the pathognomonic rash which typifies eczema vaccinatum over 80 percent of his body surface area. The boy has a history of eczema, which is a known risk factor for vaccinia infection.

See also 
 List of cutaneous conditions

References

External links 

 Side Effects of Smallpox Vaccination. Centers for Disease Control and Prevention Fact Sheet.
 Vaccine Reaction Images. CDC.

Virus-related cutaneous conditions
Complications of surgical and medical care
Vaccinia